Gola Dolna  is a settlement in the administrative district of Gmina Świdwin, within Świdwin County, West Pomeranian Voivodeship, in north-western Poland.

The settlement has a population of 90.

References

Gola Dolna